Berit Kristine Aunli, née Kvello, (born 9 June 1956) is a Norwegian former cross-country skier. She won her first international championship medal as a member of the Norwegian team that won the bronze medal at the 4 × 5 km relay at the 1980 Winter Olympics.

Her real international breakthrough came at the 1982 FIS Nordic World Ski Championships when she won gold medals at the 5 km, 10 km and 4 × 5 km relay races, and a silver medal at the 20 km classical. She became the first winner of an official Cross-Country World Cup after her overall victory in the 1981–82 FIS Cross-Country World Cup. At the 1984 Winter Olympics in Sarajevo, she won two medals with a gold in the 4 × 5 km relay and a silver in 5 km. Aunli also won a silver in the 4 × 5 km relay at the 1985 FIS Nordic World Ski Championships. At the 1981 Holmenkollen ski festival, she won the 20 km event.

In 1983, she was awarded the Holmenkollen medal (Shared with Tom Sandberg.).

She has 15 Norwegian Championships in total, representing Strindheim IL. In 1985 she won Morgenbladet's gold medal. She is the daughter of Kristen Kvello.

Cross-country skiing results
All results are sourced from the International Ski Federation (FIS).

Olympic Games
 3 medals – (1 gold, 1 silver, 1 bronze)

World Championships
 5 medals – (3 gold, 2 silver)

World Cup

Season standings

Individual podiums
4 victories 
10 podiums

Team podiums

 4 victories 
 6 podiums

Note:  Until the 1999 World Championships and the 1994 Winter Olympics, World Championship and Olympic races were included in the World Cup scoring system.

Personal life
In 1979 she married the cross-country skier Ove Aunli.

References

 Holmenkollen medalists – click Holmenkollmedaljen for downloadable pdf file 
 Holmenkollen winners since 1892 – click Vinnere for downloadable pdf file

External links
 

1956 births
Living people
Cross-country skiers at the 1976 Winter Olympics
Cross-country skiers at the 1980 Winter Olympics
Cross-country skiers at the 1984 Winter Olympics
Holmenkollen medalists
Holmenkollen Ski Festival winners
Norwegian female cross-country skiers
Olympic cross-country skiers of Norway
Olympic gold medalists for Norway
Olympic silver medalists for Norway
Olympic bronze medalists for Norway
Olympic medalists in cross-country skiing
FIS Nordic World Ski Championships medalists in cross-country skiing
FIS Cross-Country World Cup champions
Medalists at the 1984 Winter Olympics
Medalists at the 1980 Winter Olympics